Pseudatemelia filiella is a moth of the family Oecophoridae. It was described by Staudinger in 1859. It is found in France, Spain and Portugal.

The wingspan is about 14 mm.

References

Moths described in 1859
Amphisbatinae
Moths of Europe